Lila Lake is a freshwater reservoir lakes located on the south slope of Alta Mountain, in Kittitas County, Washington. Self-issued Alpine Lake Wilderness permit required for transit within the Klonaqua Lakes area. The lake is a popular area for hiking, swimming, and fishing rainbow trout.

Access
Lila Lake is located approximately half a mile north of Rachel Lake and access is obtained as an extension to Rachel Lake Trail #1313. Rampart Lakes are a short distance further south. The trail follows Box Canyon Creek from the trailhead which begins at Forest Road 4930 at the Western shores of Little Kachess Lake, approximately 20 miles east of The Summit at Snoqualmie off Interstate 90.

See also 
 List of lakes of the Alpine Lakes Wilderness

References 

Lakes of Kittitas County, Washington
Lakes of the Alpine Lakes Wilderness
Okanogan National Forest